Rosleli bin Jahari is a Malaysian politician from UMNO. He is the Member of Johor State Legislative Assembly for Johor Lama since 2018.

Politics 
On 12 May 2018, he quitted UMNO and joined BERSATU. On 6 March 2022, before the Johor state election, he had quitted BERSATU and rejoined UMNO, and was not nominated to contest in the state election.

Election results

Honours
 :
 Officer of the Order of the Defender of the Realm (KMN) (2016)

Reference 

Officers of the Order of the Defender of the Realm
Former Malaysian United Indigenous Party politicians
United Malays National Organisation politicians
Members of the Johor State Legislative Assembly
Malaysian people of Malay descent
Living people
Year of birth missing (living people)